Port Moresby Stock Exchange is the principal stock exchange of Papua New Guinea.  It is located in Port Moresby and it was founded in 1999.  Its name is abbreviated to "POMSoX"

At the time of its founding POMSox was funded by the Bank of Papua New Guinea, which is the central bank of Papua New Guinea.

According to POMSoX's website, "POMSoX is closely aligned to the Australian Stock Exchange (ASX). The ASX has licensed to POMSoX its Business and Listing Rules. POMSoX procedures are a mirror image of the ASX."

In July 2019, Port Moresby Stock Exchange was renamed to PNGX Markets Limited.

See also 
 Economy of Papua New Guinea
 List of East Asian stock exchanges
 List of South Asian stock exchanges
 List of stock exchanges
 List of stock exchanges in the Commonwealth of Nations

External links
Port Moresby Stock Exchange
PNG Markets Limited

Economy of Papua New Guinea
Stock exchanges in Oceania
Port Moresby